"Lay Down Your Guns" is a song by Australian rock musician, Jimmy Barnes. It was released in July 1990 as the lead single from Barnes' fourth studio album, Two Fires. It reached #4 on the Australian ARIA charts.

Track listing
CD Single (D10133)/ 7" single (K 10133)

 "Lay Down Your Guns" 
 "Broken Hearts"

Charts
"Lay Down Your Guns" debuted at #9 in Australia, before peaking at number 4.

Weekly charts

Year-end charts

Sales and certifications

References

Mushroom Records singles
1990 singles
1990 songs
Jimmy Barnes songs
Song recordings produced by Don Gehman
Songs written by Rick Nowels
Songs written by Jimmy Barnes